Kraš is a Croatian food company based in Zagreb, specializing in confectionery products. In 2012, Kraš was, after Podravka, the second largest Croatian exporter of food.

History
The company traces its origins from two factories from the early 20th century — "Union", founded in 1911, by Yugoslavian Jews, including Slavaljub Deutsch, the oldest surviving chocolate manufacturer in southeastern Europe — and "Bizjak", founded in 1923, which manufactured toast, cookies and wafers. Deutsch was subsequently murdered in Auschwitz and his property seized. These two companies, as well as a number of smaller confectionery manufacturers from Zagreb, merged in 1950 and took the name Kraš, in honor of Josip Kraš, a union leader and prominent Croatian communist who was killed in World War II. To date, no restitutions have been made to Deutsch’s surviving descendents.

The company was in social ownership during SFR Yugoslavia, and privatized in 1992 into a private shareholding company with capital estimated at 135,769,000 DM. In the aftermath of Yugoslav breakup, Kraš lost two thirds of its market.

In 1997, Kraš received the ISO 9001 certificate.

See also
 List of bean-to-bar chocolate manufacturers

References

Sources

External links
 
 Kraš Bajadera 

Croatian chocolate companies
Food and drink companies of Croatia
Companies listed on the Zagreb Stock Exchange
Food and drink companies established in 1911
Croatian brands
Manufacturing companies based in Zagreb
1911 establishments in Croatia